The National Sports Sedans Series, formerly the Australian Sports Sedan Championship, is a CAMS sanctioned national motor racing title for drivers of cars complying with Australian Sports Sedan regulations. This class, essentially a silhouette racing car class, caters for cars of essentially free construction but utilising some of the bodywork of a closed, series production vehicle.

The category emerged following the replacement of Appendix J Touring Cars by the more restricted Group C Improved Production Touring Cars at the end of 1964. Promoters of circuits such as Winton and Oran Park then allowed the redundant Appendix J cars to run with Sports Cars under the name Sports Racing Closed. By 1966 cars were competing with extensive modifications, often including engine swaps. By 1971 restrictions were placed on bodywork modifications ensuring that the original silhouette of the car had to be maintained. The term Sports Sedans had been in common usage for the cars and in 1973 CAMS gave the name official recognition when it introduced Group B Sports Sedans as a new racing classification. The category officially became Group 2D Sports Sedans in 1988, and Group 3D Sports Sedans in 2000.

An Australia-wide championship was run each year from 1976 to 1981. It was discontinued for 1982 with the introduction of an Australian GT Championship, although Sports Sedans were invited to compete in this new series, which many did as it was the only national series their cars were eligible for, but the older Sports Sedans were generally un-competitive against the new GT cars such as the Porsche 935 or the converted Chevrolet Monza's. While the power of the top Sports Sedans, which generally ran 5.0L or 6.0L Chevrolet V8 engines, was not far shy of the GT cars, the Sports Sedans were restricted to running 10" wheels while the GT cars such as the 935's were allowed up to 18" of rubber. This gave the GT cars far greater stability and enabled them to go much faster through turns. The Sports Sedan category itself was retained for state level racing. The Australian Sports Sedan Championship title was revived in 1991 and was contested annually through to 2003. Each championship was decided over a series of races, with the exception of the 1994 title, which was contested over two races at one meeting at Sandown Raceway in Victoria.

A National Series for Sports Sedans replaced the Australian Sports Sedan Championship for 2004 and has been included in the CAMS Nationals Racing Championships (now known as the Shannons Nationals Motor Racing Championships) since its inception in 2006.

List of champions

Winners of the Australian Sports Sedan Championship are shown below.

National Sports Sedan Series

A Sports Sedan series has been run each year from 2004, this being recognised by CAMS as a National Series rather than as an official Australian Championship. Each series has been open to cars built to American Transam or New Zealand TraNZam rules as well as cars complying with CAMS Group 3D Sports Sedan regulations.

Series winners have been :

References

External links
CAMS Manual of Motor Sport
Current National Sports Sedan Series

 
Sports Sedans
1976 establishments in Australia